Roccat GmbH is a German computer accessories manufacturer based in Hamburg. It was also the titular sponsor of former German professional esports organization Team ROCCAT.

Since 2019, the company belongs to Turtle Beach Corporation.

History 
Roccat GmbH was founded in 2006 by former Razer Vice President of Europe Renê Korte in Hamburg, Germany. Roccat also has offices in Taipei, Taiwan, and Cerritos, Los Angeles, United States.

In 2019, the company was bought by Turtle Beach Corporation for 19.2 million US dollars. Today, Roccat represents Turtle Beach's PC branch. The company has a turnover in the double-digit million range, brings around 15 new products onto the market every year and consists of 110 employees.

Products 

Roccat is dedicated to gaming hardware and offers various products like mice, keyboards, headsets, mouse pads and other PC accessories. The Vulcan line is Roccat's flagship series of keyboards. For the series, Roccat developed their own switches called Titan Switch Optical in cooperation with TTC. A beam of light that hits an optical signal when a button is pressed and thereby records an input replaces the conventional physical contact within a button. According to the manufacturer, the response time of keystrokes should be registered 40 times faster and instead of 50 million clicks, up to 100 million clicks should be possible compared to conventional mechanical keyboards.

External links 

 Official website 
 English website

References 

2006 establishments in Germany
Manufacturing companies based in Hamburg
German companies established in 2006